was a Taira defensive position at Suma, to the west of present-day Kobe, Japan. It sat on a very narrow strip of shore, between mountains on the north, and the sea to the south. This made it quite defensible, but also made it difficult to maneuver troops inside the fortress.  The Taira suffered a crucial defeat to the forces of Yoshitsune and Noriyori.

Battle

Yoshitsune split his force in two. Noriyori's force attacked the Taira at Ikuta Shrine, in the woods a short distance to the east. A second detachment, no more than a hundred horsemen under Yoshitsune, attacked the Taira at Ichinotani from the mountain ridge to the north. At the chosen hour, the Minamoto forces attacked causing confusion among the Taira who neither deployed nor retreated. Only about 3000 Taira escaped to Yashima, while Tadanori was killed and Shigehira captured.  Also killed from the Taira clan were Lord Michimori, Tsunemasa,  Atsumori, Moromori, Tomoakira, Tsunetoshi, and Moritoshi.

Ichi-no-Tani is one of the most famous battles of the Genpei War, in large part due to the individual combats that occurred here. Benkei, probably the most famous of all warrior monks, fought alongside the Minamoto Yoshitsune here, and many of the Taira's most important and powerful warriors were present as well.

Ichi-no-Tani is the last recorded instance in which crossbows were used in a Japanese siege.

Legacy
The death of Taira no Atsumori at the hand of Kumagai no Naozane during the battle is a particularly famous passage in the Heike Monogatari. It has been dramatized in noh and kabuki, and in popular fiction, Oda Nobunaga is often portrayed as performing the noh at his own death (ningen goju nen geten no uchi wo kurabureba, yumemaboroshi no gotoku nari). The death of Atsumori is arguably among the most celebrated acts of single combat in all of Japanese history.

Gallery

See also
The Tale of Heike

References

1180s in Japan
1184 in Asia
Ichi-no-tani 1184
Ichi-no-Tani